Hanger or hangers may refer to:

Hardware
 Clothes hanger, a device in the shape of human shoulders or legs used to hang clothes on
 Casing hanger, part of a wellhead assembly in oil drilling
 Derailleur hanger, a slot in a bicycle frame where the derailleur bolt attaches
 Tie (engineering), a type of structural member
 Hanger, part of a skateboard
 Hanger, a sword similar to a cutlass, used by woodsmen and soldiers in 17th to 18th centuries
 A hanger, a vertical cable or rod connecting the roadway of a suspension bridge to the bridge's main cable or arch

People
 George Wallace William Hanger (1866–1935), American
 George Hanger, 4th Baron Coleraine (1750–1824), English author and soldier in the American Revolution
 Art Hanger (born 1943), Canadian politician
 Harry Hanger (1886–1918), English footballer
 James Edward Hanger (born 1843), U.S. Civil War veteran and founder of:
 Hanger, Inc. 
 Mostyn Hanger (1908–1980), judge, chief justice of Queensland, Australia, and administrator of Queensland
Percy Hanger (1889–1939), English footballer

Places
 Hanger Lane, a stretch of the North Circular Road in London, England
 Hanger River or Anger River, a river in west central Ethiopia
 Hangers Way, a 21-mile long-distance footpath through Hampshire, England

Slang
 Hanger (barbershop music), a long note sung by one voice in a barbershop music song
 Monkey hanger, a British term for people from Hartlepool, England
 Hanger, or specky, a slang term for spectacular mark in Australian rules football
 Hangers, American slang for large, pendulous breasts

Other uses
 Hanger (film) a 2009 horror film
 Hanger steak, a tender cut of steak
 Hanger, Inc., prosthetic and orthotic provider in the United States
 An old English word for a wooded slope from the Old English word , preserved in English place names such as Hanger Lane

See also 

 Cliffhanger
 
 Hangar (disambiguation)